The cycling competition at the 1972 Summer Olympics in Munich consisted of two road cycling events and five track cycling events, all for men only.

Medal summary

Road cycling

Track cycling

Participating nations
359 cyclists from 54 nations competed.

Medal table

Notes

References
International Olympic Committee results database

 
1972 Summer Olympics events
1972
1972 in track cycling
1972 in road cycling
1972 in cycle racing